Boran  is a common unisex Persian given name. It is a derivative of the word Bora. بوران

People
Behice Boran, Turkish Marxist, politician, author and sociologist.
Orhan Boran, a Turkish radio and TV host.

Turkish-language surnames
Turkish masculine given names